South Coast Steam Ltd is a United Kingdom based steam locomotive operating company, based on the Isle of Portland, Dorset.

Owned by Barry Gambles and incorporated in January 2003, the company is registered along with South Coast Crane Hire in Loughborough, but operationally located in South Coast Crane Hire's main yard on Portland.

Locomotives

References

Companies based in Dorset
British companies established in 2003
Private companies limited by guarantee of the United Kingdom
Heritage railways in the United Kingdom
Transport companies established in 2003
2003 establishments in England